Bowbells is a city in and the county seat of Burke County, North Dakota, United States. The population was 301 at the 2020 census.

History
The city of Bowbells was founded in 1898 along the main line of the Soo Line Railroad and incorporated in 1906. The city was named by railroad officials after the famed Bow bells at St Mary-le-Bow in London, England.

The city's centennial celebration was held in the third week in July, 2006. Several hundred people from all over the country registered and attended. Burke County celebrated its centennial in the summer of 2010.

Culture
The town is home to a Lutheran, a Methodist, and a Roman Catholic church.

A municipal golf course is located four miles east of the city, and a community swimming pool, park and campground are available as well for visitors and residents.

Bowbells' schoolhouse, built in 1909 at a cost of $15,000, is still in use. Due to attentive management over the years, the brick building is still in good condition and currently houses kindergarten through sixth grade students. The building has a jerkinhead roof, combining gable and hipped roof types.

Economy
Farmers in the area produce crops such as barley, canola, flax, oats, peas, sunflowers, durum and Hard Red Spring Wheat. There have been substantial oil wells in the area and thus oil-related businesses, including drilling, service and distribution businesses.

Some of the businesses in the town include an implement dealership, SunPrairie Grain (a division of CHS Incorporated), Savage Industries, and government-related buildings and businesses. The town's main street includes a gas station, a service station, a handful of crop and property insurance agencies, Dacotah Bank, The Newly Remodeled Historic Bowbells Hotel and North Dakota Wine Kitchen. Since Bowbells is the county seat of Burke County, the county courthouse is located here.  It's on the southwest side of town.  The official county newspaper, The Burke County Tribune newspaper, is located in the city as well.

Montana-Dakota Utilities provides electrical service to the town.  There is no municipal natural gas service.

Geography
Bowbells is located at  (48.8038, -102.2462), a few miles west of Upper Des Lacs Lake and the Des Lacs National Wildlife Refuge. The Des Lacs valley was formed as meltwater flowed out of Glacial Lake Regina thousands of years ago.

It is located approximately 52 miles northwest of Minot, the nearest city with an international airport (MOT) and 30 miles north of Stanley, the nearest passenger train station.

Demographics

2010 census
As of the census of 2010, there were 336 people, 161 households, and 93 families residing in the city. The racial makeup of the city was 96.4% White, 0.6% Native American, 2.7% Asian, and 0.3% from two or more races. Hispanic or Latino of any race were 0.6% of the population.

There were 161 households, of which 24.2% had children under the age of 18 living with them, 46.6% were married couples living together, 7.5% had a female householder with no husband present, 3.7% had a male householder with no wife present, and 42.2% were non-families. 36.0% of all households were made up of individuals, and 16.2% had someone living alone who was 65 years of age or older. The average household size was 2.09 and the average family size was 2.70.

The median age in the city was 47.7 years. 21.4% of residents were under the age of 18; 6.7% were between the ages of 18 and 24; 18.3% were from 25 to 44; 34.7% were from 45 to 64; and 19% were 65 years of age or older. The gender makeup of the city was 52.4% male and 47.6% female.

2000 census
As of the census of 2000, there were 406 people, 174 households, and 116 families residing in the town. The population density was 511.2 people per square mile (198.4/km2). There were 214 housing units at an average density of 269.5 per square mile (104.6/km2). The racial makeup of the town was 98.77% White, 0.74% Native American, 0.25% Asian, and 0.25% from two or more races. Hispanic or Latino of any race were 0.25% of the population.

There were 174 households, out of which 31.6% had children under the age of 18 living with them, 55.7% were married couples living together, 7.5% had a female householder with no husband present, and 33.3% were non-families. 32.2% of all households were made up of individuals, and 19.5% had someone living alone who was 65 years of age or older. The average household size was 2.33 and the average family size was 2.97.

In the town the population was spread out, with 27.3% under the age of 18, 3.7% from 18 to 24, 24.9% from 25 to 44, 23.2% from 45 to 64, and 20.9% who were 65 years of age or older. About 100 K-12 students attend the town's local public school. The median age was 42 years. For every 100 females, there were 91.5 males. For every 100 females age 18 and over, there were 90.3 males.

The median income for a household in the town was $30,455, and the median income for a family was $35,625. Males had a median income of $30,833 versus $12,212 for females. The per capita income for the town was $15,491. About 9.2% of families and 8.6% of the population were below the poverty line, including 8.1% of those under age 18 and 5.9% of those age 65 or over.

In popular culture
The town of Bowbells was referenced in an episode of the television series Royal Pains as the hometown of a married couple who wins a large sum of money in an undisclosed lottery and move to The Hamptons to renew their wedding vows.

The town of Ludendorff in the video game Grand Theft Auto V was based on the town of Bowbells. It is featured in the prologue and the mission “Bury The Hatchet,” and is referenced throughout the game.

Notable people
Les Jepsen, former NBA and University of Iowa basketball player, born and raised in Bowbells
Francis D. Lyon, Hollywood director and Academy Award-winning film editor, born in Bowbells

Climate
This climatic region is typified by large seasonal temperature differences, with warm to hot (and often humid) summers and cold (sometimes severely cold) winters.  According to the Köppen Climate Classification system, Bowbells has a humid continental climate, abbreviated "Dfb" on climate maps.

See also
 Northgate Border Crossing

References

External links
City of Bowbells official website
Bowbells public school website

... Small Towns Disappear, a September 2005 VOA story about Bowbells, also in MP3 audio format
Bowbells diamond jubilee and school reunion, 1981 from the Digital Horizons website

Cities in Burke County, North Dakota
Cities in North Dakota
County seats in North Dakota
Populated places established in 1898
1898 establishments in North Dakota